

Biography
Marc-Antoine Goulard is a French artist, born in 1964 in Neuilly-sur-Seine, who defends abstract lyric painting. He began his career as a classical musician then as a painter. He lives in, London since 2010

Musician
Marc-Antoine Goulard learned the piano from the age of 4 years old then start to play the flute at 9 years old. He studied the flute and composition at the conservatory of music of Rueil-Malmaison then graduated with honor at the conservatory in Paris to become a concertist.
 
Marc-Antoine arrived in America in 1985 to take up the saxophone and continued his studies in jazz composition at the prestigious Berklee college of Music . However while music, with its foundation of tone and composition, provided him the means for expression, it would ultimately be in painting that Goulard found his creative voice.

Painter Designer
Marc-Antoine Goulard discovered painting in May 1988 and received a residency in 2009 at the Josef Albers and Anni Foundation in Bethany, Connecticut.
Art critic Nicholas Fox Weber, biographer and director of an art foundation, he recognized the quality of Marc-Antoine Goulard's  visual work and published in September 2008 the catalogue " raisonné " of his paintings.

The social platform Saatchi Online exhibit the creative envinroment and portfolio of Marc-Antoine Goulard.

Among many galleries Marc-Antoine Goulard's paintings are shown at the following ones: Gallery William Turner in Los Angeles, galerie Brissot (rue de Verneuil) Paris, gallery Ruth Morpeth in New Jersey, gallery Cynthia Drennon in Santa Fe and the gallery Cynthia Corbett in London  - Bruno Framont - Connecticut, USA. Gallery " 174 Faubourg " Paris, France, Josephine  Clavel projects in London

His monotypes are printed and published with the Editions Jacques Berville in Arpaillargues.
 
He has been chosen as the French artist for the cultural year France - Russia 2010.
 
Marc-Antoine Goulard has also been the patron in 2005 for the association "Tous les enfants ont des droits" where his paintings have been disseminate at the Sénat (France).

See also

History of painting
Lyrical Abstraction
Abstract expressionism
Designer

Notes

References

Further reading
Berklee College of Music

External links
 Official website of Marc-Antoine Goulard
 The Josef and Anni Albers Foundation

20th-century French painters
20th-century French male artists
French male painters
21st-century French painters
21st-century French male artists
Living people
1964 births